Weesby is a municipality in the district of Schleswig-Flensburg, in Schleswig-Holstein, Germany. In 2012 it had a population of 456.

References

Municipalities in Schleswig-Holstein
Schleswig-Flensburg